Saint Kitts and Nevis, officially the Federation of Saint Christopher and Nevis, is an island country and microstate consisting of the two islands of Saint Kitts and Nevis, both located in the West Indies, in the Leeward Islands chain of the Lesser Antilles. With  of territory, and roughly 50,000 inhabitants, it is the smallest sovereign state in the Western Hemisphere, in both area and population, as well as the world's smallest sovereign federation. The country is a Commonwealth realm, with Charles III as King and head of state. It is the only sovereign federation in the Caribbean.

The capital city is Basseterre, located on the larger island of Saint Kitts. Basseterre is also the main port for passenger entry (via cruise ships) and cargo.

The British dependency of Anguilla was historically also a part of this union, which was known collectively as Saint Christopher-Nevis-Anguilla. However, Anguilla chose to secede from the union, and remains a British overseas territory. The islands of Sint Eustatius, Saba, Saint Barthélemy, Saint-Martin/Sint Maarten and Anguilla lie to the north-northwest of the country. To the east and northeast are Antigua and Barbuda, and to the southeast is the small uninhabited island of Redonda (part of Antigua and Barbuda) and the island of Montserrat.

Saint Kitts and Nevis were among the first islands in the Caribbean to be colonised by Europeans. Saint Kitts was home to the first British and French Caribbean colonies, and thus has also been titled "The Mother Colony of the West Indies". It is also the most recent British territory in the Caribbean to become independent, gaining independence in 1983.

Etymology 

The Kalinago, the pre-European inhabitants of Saint Kitts, called the island Liamuiga, roughly translating as "fertile land".

It is thought that Christopher Columbus, the first European to see the islands in 1493, named the larger island , after Saint Christopher, his patron saint and that of travellers. The first English colonists kept the English translation of this name, and dubbed it St. Christopher's Island. In the 17th century, a common nickname for Christopher was Kit(t); hence, the island came to be informally referred to as Saint Kitt's Island, later further shortened to Saint Kitts.

Columbus gave Nevis the name  (Saint Martin). The current name Nevis is derived from a Spanish name , meaning "Our Lady of the Snows", a reference to the 4th-century Catholic miracle of a summertime snowfall on the Esquiline Hill in Rome. It is not known who chose this name for the island, but it is thought that white clouds which usually wreath the top of Nevis Peak reminded someone of the miracle.

Today, the Constitution refers to the state as both Saint Kitts and Nevis and Saint Christopher and Nevis;  the former is the one most commonly used, but the latter is generally used for diplomatic relations.

History

Pre-colonial period

The name of the first inhabitants, pre-Arawakan peoples who settled the islands perhaps as early as 3000 years ago, is not known. They were followed by the Arawak peoples, or Taíno, about 1000 BC. The Island Caribs invaded about 800 AD.

European arrival and early colonial period
Christopher Columbus was the first European to sight the islands in 1493. The first settlers were the English in 1623, led by Thomas Warner, who established a settlement at Old Road Town on the west coast of St Kitts after achieving an agreement with the Carib chief Ouboutou Tegremante. The French later also settled on St Kitts in 1625 under Pierre Belain d'Esnambuc. As a result, both parties agreed to partition the island into French and English sectors. From 1628 onward the English also began settling on Nevis.

The French and English, intent on exploitation of the island's resources, encountered resistance from the native Caribs (Kalinago), who waged war during the first three years of the settlements' existence. The Europeans resolved to rid themselves of this problem. An ideological campaign was waged by colonial chroniclers, dating back to the Spanish, as they produced literature which denied the Kalinagos' humanity (a literary tradition carried through the late-seventeenth century by such authors as Jean-Baptiste du Tertre and Pere Labat). In 1626 the Anglo-French settlers joined forces to massacre the Kalinago at a place that became known as Bloody Point, allegedly to preempt a Carib plan to expel or kill all European settlers. Thereafter, the English and French established large sugar plantations which were worked by imported African slaves. This made the planter-colonists rich, but drastically altered the islands' demographics as black slaves soon came to outnumber Europeans.

A Spanish expedition of 1629 sent to enforce Spanish claims destroyed the English and French colonies and deported the settlers back to their respective countries. As part of the war settlement in 1630, the Spanish permitted the re-establishment of the English and French colonies. Spain later formally recognised Britain's claim to St Kitts with the Treaty of Madrid (1670), in return for British cooperation in the fight against piracy.

As Spanish power declined, Saint Kitts became a key base for English and French expansion in the Caribbean. From St Kitts the British settled the islands of Antigua, Montserrat, Anguilla and Tortola, and the French settled Martinique, the Guadeloupe archipelago and Saint Barthélemy. During the late 17th century, France and England fought for control over St Kitts and Nevis, fighting wars in 1667, 1689–90 and 1701–13. The French renounced their claim to the islands with the Treaty of Utrecht in 1713. The islands' economy, already shattered by war, was further harmed by natural disasters: In 1690 an earthquake destroyed Jamestown, capital of Nevis, forcing the construction of a new capital at Charlestown; further damage was caused by a hurricane in 1707.

British colonial period
The colony had recovered by the turn of the 18th century, and St Kitts had become the richest British Crown Colony per capita in the Caribbean as result of its slave-based sugar industry by the close of the 1700s. The 18th century also saw Nevis, formerly the richer of the two islands, being eclipsed by St Kitts in economic importance. Alexander Hamilton, the future U.S. secretary of the Treasury, was born on Nevis in 1755 or 1757.

As Britain became embroiled in war with its American colonies, the French decided to use the opportunity to re-capture St Kitts in 1782; however St Kitts was given back and recognised as British territory in the Treaty of Paris (1783).

The African slave trade was terminated within the British Empire in 1807, and slavery outlawed completely in 1834. A four-year "apprenticeship" period followed for each slave, in which they worked for their former owners for wages. On Nevis 8,815 slaves were freed, while St Kitts freed 19,780.

Saint Kitts and Nevis, along with Anguilla, were federated in 1882. In the first few decades of the 20th century economic hardship and lack of opportunities led to the growth of a labour movement; the Great Depression prompted sugar workers to go on strike in 1935. The 1940s saw the founding of the St Kitts-Nevis-Anguilla Labour Party (later renamed the Saint Kitts and Nevis Labour Party, or SKNLP) under Robert Llewellyn Bradshaw. Bradshaw later became Chief Minister and then Premier of the colony from 1966 to 1978; he sought to gradually bring the sugar-based economy under greater state control. The more conservative-leaning People's Action Movement party (PAM) was founded in 1965.

After a brief period as part of the West Indies Federation (1958–62), the islands became an associated state with full internal autonomy in 1967. Residents of Nevis and Anguilla were unhappy with St Kitts's domination of the federation, and Anguilla unilaterally declared independence in 1967. In 1971 Britain resumed full control of Anguilla, but it was formally separated in 1980. Attention then focused on Nevis, with the Nevis Reformation Party seeking to safeguard the smaller island's interests in any future independent state. Eventually it was agreed that the island would have a degree of autonomy with its own Premier and Assembly, as well as the constitutionally-protected right to unilaterally secede if a referendum on independence resulted in a two-thirds majority in favour. St Kitts and Nevis achieved full independence on 19 September 1983. Kennedy Simmonds of the PAM, Premier since 1980, duly became the country's first Prime Minister. St Kitts and Nevis opted to remain within the British Commonwealth, retaining Queen Elizabeth as Monarch, represented locally by a Governor-General.

Post independence era

Kennedy Simmonds went on to win elections in 1984, 1989 and 1993, before being unseated when the SKNLP returned to power in 1995 under Denzil Douglas.

In Nevis, growing discontent with their perceived marginalisation within the federation led to a referendum to separate from St Kitts in 1998, which though resulting a 62% vote to secede, fell short of the required two-thirds majority to be legally enacted.

In late-September 1998, Hurricane Georges caused approximately $458,000,000 in damages and limited GDP growth for the year and beyond. Meanwhile, the sugar industry, in decline for years and propped up only by government subsidies, was closed completely in 2005.

The 2015 Saint Kitts and Nevis general election was won by Timothy Harris and his recently formed People's Labour Party, with backing from the PAM and the Nevis-based Concerned Citizens' Movement under the 'Team Unity' banner.

In June 2020, Team Unity coalition of the incumbent government, led by Prime Minister Timothy Harris, won general elections by defeating Saint Kitts and Nevis Labour Party (SKNLP).

In snap general elections held in August 2022, the SKNLP again won, and Terrance Drew became the fourth prime minister of Saint Kitts and Nevis.

Politics 

Saint Kitts and Nevis is a sovereign, democratic, and federal state. It is a Commonwealth realm, a constitutional monarchy with the King of Saint Christopher and Nevis, Charles III, as its head of state. The King is represented in the country by a Governor-General, who acts on the advice of the Prime Minister and the Cabinet. The Prime Minister is the leader of the majority party of the House, and the cabinet conducts affairs of state.

St. Kitts and Nevis has a unicameral legislature, known as the National Assembly. It is composed of fourteen members: eleven elected representatives (three from the island of Nevis) and three senators, who are appointed by the Governor-General. Two of the senators are appointed on the advice of the Prime Minister, and one, on the advice of the leader of the opposition. Unlike in other countries, the senators do not constitute a separate senate or upper house of parliament, but sit in the National Assembly alongside representatives. All members serve five-year terms. The Prime Minister and the Cabinet answer to the Parliament. Nevis also maintains its own semi-autonomous assembly.

Foreign relations 

Saint Kitts and Nevis has no major international disputes. Saint Kitts and Nevis is a full and participating member of the Caribbean Community (CARICOM), the Organisation of Eastern Caribbean States (OECS), and the Organisation of American States (OAS).

St Kitts & Nevis entered the OAS system on 16 September 1984.

Agreements which impact on financial relationships

Double Taxation Relief (CARICOM) Treaty 1994
At a CARICOM meeting, representative of St. Kitts and Nevis Kennedy Simmons signed the Double Taxation Relief (CARICOM) Treaty 1994, on 6 July 1994.

The representatives of seven CARICOM countries signed similar agreements at Sherbourne Conference Centre, St. Michael, Barbados. The countries whose representatives signed the treaties in Barbados were: Antigua & Barbuda, Belize, Grenada, Jamaica, St. Lucia, St. Vincent & the Grenadines and Trinidad & Tobago. This treaty covered income, residence, tax jurisdictions, capital gains, business profits, interest, dividends, royalties and other areas.

FATCA
On 30 June 2014, St. Kitts and Nevis signed a Model 1 agreement with the United States of America in relation to Foreign Account Tax Compliance Act (FATCA). On the 28 April 2016, the status of the agreement went to "In Force".

Military 

Saint Kitts and Nevis has a defence force of 300 personnel. It is mostly involved in policing and drug trade interception.

Human rights 

Male homosexuality is legal in St. Kitts and Nevis since 29 August 2022. In 2011, the Government of St. Kitts and Nevis said it had "no mandate from the people" to abolish the criminalisation of homosexuality among consenting adults.

Administrative divisions
The federation of Saint Kitts and Nevis is divided into fourteen parishes, nine divisions on Saint Kitts and five on Nevis.

Geography 

The country consists of two main islands, Saint Kitts and Nevis, separated at a distance of 2 miles (3 km) by The Narrows strait. Both are of volcanic origin, with large central peaks covered in tropical rainforest. The majority of the population live along the flatter coastal areas. St Kitts contains several mountain ranges (the North West Range, Central Range and South-West Range) in its centre, where the highest peak of the country, Mount Liamuiga  can be found. Along the east coast can be found the Canada Hills and Conaree Hills. The land narrows considerably in the south-east, forming a much flatter peninsula which contains the largest body of water, the Great Salt Pond. To the southeast, in The Narrows, lies the small isle of Booby Island. There are numerous rivers descending from the mountains of both islands, which provide fresh water to the local population. Nevis, the smaller of the two main islands and roughly circular in shape, is dominated by Nevis Peak .

Saint Kitts and Nevis contains two terrestrial ecoregions: Leeward Islands moist forests and Leeward Islands dry forests. The country had a 2019 Forest Landscape Integrity Index mean score of 4.55/10, ranking it 121st globally out of 172 countries.

Fauna
The national bird is the brown pelican. 176 species of bird have been reported from the country.

Flora 
The national flower is Delonix regia. Common plants include palmetto, hibiscus, bougainvillea, and tamarind. Pinus species are common in the dense forests of islands, and are usually covered by various species of ferns.

Climate 
By the Köppen climate classification, St Kitts has a tropical savanna climate (Köppen Aw) and Nevis has a tropical monsoon climate (Köppen Am).

Demographics

Population 
The population of Saint Kitts and Nevis is around 53,000 (July 2019 est.) and has remained relatively constant for many years. At the end of the nineteenth century there were 42,600 residents, the number slowly rising to a little over 50,000 by the mid-twentieth century. Between 1960 and 1990, the population dropped from 50,000 to 40,000, before rising again to its current level. Approximately three-quarters of the population live on Saint Kitts, with 15,500 of these living in the capital, Basseterre. Other large settlements include Cayon (population 3,000) and Sandy Point Town (3,000), both on Saint Kitts, and Gingerland (2,500) and Charlestown (1,900), both on Nevis.

Racial and ethnic groups
The population is primarily Afro-Caribbean (92.5%), with significant minorities of European (2.1%) and Indian (1.5%) descent (2001 estimate).

Emigration
, there were  inhabitants; their average life expectancy is 76.9 years. Emigration has historically been very high, so high that the total estimated population in 2007 was little changed from that in 1961.

Emigration from St Kitts and Nevis to the United States:
 1986–1990: 3,513
 1991–1995: 2,730
 1996–2000: 2,101
 2001–2005: 1,756
 2006–2010: 1,817

Religion 

Most inhabitants (82%) are Christians, most of whom belong to Anglican, Methodist, and other Protestant denominations, Roman Catholics are pastorally served by the Roman Catholic Diocese of Saint John's–Basseterre, while the Anglicans by the Diocese of the North East Caribbean and Aruba.

Hinduism is the largest non-Christian religion, followed by 1.82% of the population. It is followed mainly by the Indo-Kittitians and Indo-Nevisians.

According to the 2011 census, 17 percent of the population is Anglican; 16 percent Methodist; 11 percent Pentecostal; 7 percent Church of God; 6 percent Roman Catholic; 5 percent each Baptist, Moravian, Seventh-day Adventist, and Wesleyan Holiness; 4 percent other; and 2 percent each Brethren, evangelical Christian, and Hindu.

Culture

Languages
English is the sole official language. Saint Kitts Creole is also widely spoken.

Music and festivals

Saint Kitts and Nevis is known for a number of musical celebrations including Carnival (18 December to 3 January on Saint Kitts). The last week in June features the St Kitts Music Festival, while the week-long Culturama on Nevis lasts from the end of July into early August.

Additional festivals on the island of Saint Kitts include Inner City Fest, in February in Molineaux; Green Valley Festival, usually around Whit Monday in village of Cayon; Easterama, around Easter in village of Sandy Point; Fest-Tab, in July or August in the village of Tabernacle; and La festival de Capisterre, around Independence Day in Saint Kitts and Nevis (19 September), in the Capisterre region. These celebrations typically feature parades, street dances and salsa, jazz, soca, calypso and steelpan music.

The 1985 film Missing in Action 2: The Beginning was filmed in Saint Kitts.

Sports

Cricket is common in Saint Kitts and Nevis. Top players can be selected for the West Indies cricket team. The late Runako Morton was from Nevis. Saint Kitts and Nevis was the smallest country to host 2007 Cricket World Cup matches,  which were played at the Warner Park Stadium.

Rugby and netball are also common in Saint Kitts and Nevis as well.

The St Kitts and Nevis national football team, also known as the "Sugar Boyz", has experienced some international success in recent years, progressing to the semi-final round of qualification for the 2006 FIFA World Cup in the CONCACAF region. Led by Glence Glasgow, they defeated the US Virgin Islands and Barbados before they were outmatched by Mexico, Saint Vincent and the Grenadines, and Trinidad and Tobago. Despite not representing the country, Marcus Rashford is of descent.

The St Kitts and Nevis Billiard Federation, SKNBF, is the governing body for cue sports across the two islands. The SKNBF is a member of the Caribbean Billiards Union (CBU) with the SKNBF President Ste Williams holding the post of CBU Vice-president.

Kim Collins is the country's foremost track and field athlete. He has won gold medals in the 100 metres at both the World Championships in Athletics and Commonwealth Games, and at the 2000 Sydney Olympics he was the country's first athlete to reach an Olympic final. He and three other athletes represented St Kitts and Nevis at the 2008 Summer Olympics in Beijing. The four by one hundred metre relay team won a bronze medal at the 2011 world championships. Jason Rogers, Antoine Adams, and Brijesh Lawrence ran the other three relay legs with Collins.

American writer and former figure skater and triathlete Kathryn Bertine was granted dual citizenship in an attempt to make the 2008 Summer Olympics representing St Kitts and Nevis in women's cycling. Her story was chronicled online at ESPN.com as a part of its E-Ticket feature entitled "So You Wanna Be An Olympian?" She ultimately failed to earn the necessary points for Olympic qualification.

St Kitts and Nevis had two athletes ride in the time trial at the 2010 UCI Road World Championships: Reginald Douglas and James Weekes.

Economy 

Saint Kitts and Nevis is a twin-island federation whose economy is characterised by its dominant tourism, agriculture, and light manufacturing industries. Sugar was the primary export from the 1940s on, but rising production costs, low world market prices, and the government's efforts to reduce dependence on it have led to a growing diversification of the agricultural sector. In 2005, the government decided to close down the state-owned sugar company, which had experienced losses and was a significant contributor to the fiscal deficit.

St Kitts and Nevis is heavily dependent upon tourism to drive its economy, a sector which has expanded significantly since the 1970s. In 2009 there were 587,479 arrivals to Saint Kitts compared to 379,473 in 2007, an increase of just under 40% in a two-year period, however the tourist sector decreased during the Global financial crisis and has only recently returned to pre-crash levels. In recent years the government has sought to diversify the economy via agriculture, tourism, export-oriented manufacturing, and offshore banking.

In July 2015, St Kitts & Nevis and the Republic of Ireland signed a tax agreement to "promote international co-operation in tax matters through exchange of information." The agreement was developed by the OECD Global Forum Working Group on Effective Exchange of Information, which consisted of representatives from OECD member countries and 11 other countries in the Caribbean and other parts of the world.

Transport

Saint Kitts and Nevis has two international airports. The larger one is Robert L. Bradshaw International Airport on the island of Saint Kitts with service outside to the Caribbean, North America, and Europe. The other airport, Vance W. Amory International Airport, is located on the island of Nevis and has flights to other parts of the Caribbean.

The St Kitts Scenic Railway is the last remaining running railroad in the Lesser Antilles.

Economic citizenship by investment

St Kitts allows foreigners to obtain the status of St Kitts citizen by means of a government sponsored investment programme called Citizenship-by-Investment. Established in 1984, St Kitts's citizenship programme is the oldest prevailing economic citizenship programme of this kind in the world. However, while the programme is the oldest in the world, it only catapulted in 2006 when Henley & Partners, a global citizenship advisory firm, became involved in the restructuring of the programme to incorporate donations to the country's sugar industry.

Citizenship-by-Investment Programmes have been criticised by some researchers due to the risks of corruption, money laundering and tax evasion. According to the official website of St Kitts's Citizenship-by-Investment Programme they offer multiple benefits: "When you acquire citizenship under the St Kitts & Nevis citizenship programme, you and your family enjoy full citizenship for life, which can be passed on to future generations by descent. As citizens of St Kitts & Nevis, you and your family are issued with passports which allow visa-free travel to more than 140 countries and territories worldwide, including all of the EU. Of course you have the right to take up residence in St Kitts & Nevis as well as in most of the CARICOM member countries at any time and for any length of time".

Each candidate must go through several legal steps and make a qualifying investment into the country and should complete certain legal requirements to qualify for citizenship under the investment programme. The applicant must make at least a minimum investment in either approved real estate, the Sugar Industry Diversification Foundation (SDIF), or the Sustainable Growth Fund (SGF) to qualify for the economic citizenship of St Kitts and Nevis.

According to Henley & Partners, the requirements are as follows:
 An investment in designated real estate with a minimum value of US$400,000, plus the payment of government fees and other fees and taxes.
 A contribution to the Sugar Industry Diversification Fund of at least US$250,000, inclusive of all government fees but exclusive of due diligence fees which are the same for the real estate option.

According to Imperial & Legal, from 1 April 2018 St Kitts and Nevis government implemented a new investment option – Contribution to Sustainable Growth Fund (SGF). To qualify for citizenship of St Kitts & Nevis, applicants who choose to invest in SGF will need to make a once-off non-refundable contribution of $150,000 plus due diligence fees.

Education 

There are eight publicly administered high and secondary level schools in St Kitts and Nevis, and several private secondary schools. Education is compulsory between the ages of 5 and 16.

See also

 ISO 3166-2:KN
 Outline of Saint Kitts and Nevis
 Index of Saint Kitts and Nevis–related articles

References

Sources

External links

 Government
 Saint Kitts & Nevis official government site
 Saint Kitts & Nevis Citizenship by Investment Program
 Saint Kitts & Nevis official Investment Promotion Agency
 Saint Kitts & Nevis St Kitts Financial Services Regulatory Commission
 Saint Kitts & Nevis Citizenship Program

 General information
 Saint Kitts and Nevis. The World Factbook. Central Intelligence Agency.
 Saint Kitts and Nevis from OCB Libraries GovPubs
 

 Maps
 GeoHack list of street, satellite, and topographic maps
 Caribbean-On-Line, St Kitts & Nevis Maps
 

 Tourism
 Nevis Tourism Authority – official site
 Saint Kitts Tourism Authority – official site

 
Countries in the Caribbean
Island countries
English-speaking countries and territories
Federal monarchies
Member states of the Caribbean Community
Member states of the Commonwealth of Nations
Member states of the Organisation of Eastern Caribbean States
Former British colonies and protectorates in the Americas
States and territories established in 1983
Member states of the United Nations
Small Island Developing States
1983 establishments in North America
British Leeward Islands in World War II
Countries in North America